StartupBus is an annual technological startup competition and entrepreneurship boot camp, described as a Hackathon, created by Elias Bizannes in February 2010. The competition is held across a 3-day bus ride where contestants or "buspreneurs" compete to conceive the best technology startup. The competition seeks to attract young top talents to compete, to search for the most innovative startup conceived by the groups, where the winners are determined by a panel of judges. Starting from February 2011, it has gone through many iterations in various continents from 2011 to the present day, with the first in Austin, Texas and subsequently in North America, Europe and Africa.

StartupBus receives an extensive online media coverage through platforms such as BBC News, CNN and technology blogs and news sites such as The Next Web, VentureBeat, WIRED and TechCrunch. Live coverage of the competition was also broadcast through StartupBus.TV via Livestream.

StartupBus held its 9th annual North American competition in New Orleans, Louisiana on April 27, 2018.

History

StartupBus started off as a joke by Elias Bizannes and Bart Jellema on 1 July 2009 to start a hackathon on bus trip from San Francisco to Austin for the SXSW Conference. Eventually, the first bus launched on 1 February 2010, which consisted of 25 strangers on the way to Austin for the SXSW Conference. During which a total of 6 startups were conceived from the time in the bus. Soon after, starting from February 2011, StartupBus was officially an annual technological startup competition.

Concept

Prior to competition
StartupBus' start off location is determined through voting via Facebook and Twitter since 2012, after its evident success.
Buspreneurs are selected based on an invite-only basis after indicating their interest through submission of an application and proposal with an interview there after, if shortlisted. Application are only open to those who specializes in the field of coding, designing and business. 
Pre-events are organised before the competition to bond buspreneurs with the objective to create a network of like-minded people.

Competition format
The competition starts off with a 72-hour bus ride from the determined start-off location to its destination, voted through Facebook and Twitter. Each bus consists of 24 buspreneurs, which comes equipped with Wi-Fi, charging points and tables among the seats with no other luxuries.

Through the 72-hour bus ride, buspreneurs are to form teams of 3-4 members of their choosing and work on their final product which comes in the form of viable web applications to be presented to a panel of judges for submission on the end of the competition day. Winners will get funding to kick-start their idea with prior winners of StartupBus being able to expand their creations and creating new ones.

Power on board the StartupBus is however short in supply and with Wi-Fi that is unstable at times, making the competition even tougher for the buspreneurs. On-board are experienced mentors from prior StartupBus competitions, available to help the teams out. Pit stops are made where buspreneurs gather feedback on their products, learn about business environments and to rest for the night.

Sponsors
Activities on board the StartupBus competition and application fee upon acceptance are subjected to the amount of funding they receive each year. As much as possible, StartupBus tries to minimise application fees to allow college students to have the ability to participate in the competition. If sponsorship is low, busprenuers may also have to pay for their own night lodging.

Bus Routes
StartupBus competitions cover 4 continents - North America, Europe, Africa and Australasia - and 26 countries. 15 major events had been held since its debut in 2010.

North America
Eight StartupBus North America competitions had been held in North America annually since its debut in 2010.

Europe
Six StartupBus Europe competitions had been held in Europe since 2012.

Africa
StartupBus Africa 2013's first bus into Africa with a total of 30 buspreneurs started their journey from 17 November to 21 November 2013. The bus started out from the Capital of Zimbabwe, Harare and its final destination was South Africa, Cape Town for the Global Entrepreneurship Week.

Pacific
StartupBus' first time in Australia since its debut 5 years ago was done in partnership with SydStart. StartupBus Pacific 2014 started from 29 August 2014 to 2 September 2014 with 25 buspreneurs. StartupBus Pacific 2014 departed from Sydney and on to Melbourne and Canberra before arriving at its destination in Sydstart's Main Day 2014 in Sydney, Australia.
Products that successfully caught the attention of judges and the public were Dinner Companion which links business people who are looking for company over the meal for dinner, Spexy.me which allows people to design and print their own 3-D glasses and order them, and FailPage which converts error pages into useful computer metrics for companies.

Winners 
After three rounds of judging, i.e. qualification, semi-final and final rounds, one winner is chosen by the judges.

North America

Europe

Africa 
StartupBus Africa 2013's winner was Workforce, a mobile-powered planning application connection employees and employers to simplify workforce planning in construction sites. The platform links unskilled worker teams with potential employers through an SMS-based communication system. Runners-up to StartupBus Africa 2013 were Funeral.ly, a funeral management application, and Bribed, an application to tackle bribery issues across Africa. A notable alum of this bus was Sterio.me, which later was accepted to the Start Up Chile accelerator and featured on BBC Africa and the Guardian.

Pacific 
People of the Sun, a solar startup, was announced the winner of StartupBus Pacific 2014.

Judges

North America

Community
The StartupBus Community is a network of people who have previously participated in the various StartupBus competitions. The StartupBus Community consists of more than 1600 alumni from all around the world who interact to play, work and live together.

Notable alumni companies 
Many alumni continued to stay as a team after the hackathon and pursue new startups. Alumni businesses have raised over $400 million in funding, with notable acquisitions by Facebook, Andreessen Horowitz and Microsoft. Notable alumni companies include:

Founded on StartupBus 
 Wastebits
 Smart Host
 Bridgefy

Founded by StartupBus teams and alumni 
 Instacart
 Major League Hacking
 Touchlab
 Sunrise (acquired by Microsoft)
 Branch (acquired by Facebook)
 Mondo
 Keen IO
 Complion
 Airpair
 WeVue
 1 Second Everyday

Media reception 
StartupBus had received generally positive reception from the hackathon community. VentureBeat described StartupBus, according to its riders, "the mother of all hackathons", and WIRED Magazine called "the StartupBus as close to blood sport as Silicon Valley entrepreneurship gets. By compressing the time from concept to prototype, it becomes a pedal-to-the-metal business incubator."

References

External links

Software developer communities
Hackathons